Kristin Peak is a peak rising to over  at the north end of Giggenbach Ridge on Ross Island, Antarctica. It was named by the Advisory Committee on Antarctic Names (2000) after Kristin Larson, who has participated in support activities to the United States Antarctic Program from 1988, including two winters at McMurdo Station; was supervisor, Eklund Biological Center and Thiel Labs, 1988 and 1992; supervisor, Crary Science and Engineering Center, 1992–95; editor of the Antarctican Society newsletter from 1996; later on the staff of the Office of Polar Programs, National Science Foundation.

References

Mountains of Ross Island